The Clifford House (also known as the Clifford-Taylor House) is a historic home in Eustis, Florida, United States. It is located at 536 North Bay Street. On April 4, 1975, it was added to the U.S. National Register of Historic Places.  It was owned by G.D. Clifford, an early settler and local merchandiser.

Clifford house has 18 rooms and is home to the Eustis Historical Museum & Preservation Society, which was founded in 1983.

Eustis Historical Museum
Each room of the Clifford House has a different theme, and features period antiques and displays of local history.  One room is called the “Indiana Jones Room”, and is dedicated to the memory of Dr. Edgar J. Banks, a professor and archaeologist who spent time in Eustis, and who is held up as the inspiration for the character of Indiana Jones.

The Citrus Museum is located next to Clifford House, and features exhibits related to the area's former importance in the citrus industry, including labels, posters, utensils, tools, equipment and other memorabilia.

References

External links

 Lake County listings at National Register of Historic Places
 Florida's Office of Cultural and Historical Programs
 Lake County listings
 Clifford House
  Eustis Historical Museum - official site

Houses on the National Register of Historic Places in Florida
National Register of Historic Places in Lake County, Florida
Museums in Lake County, Florida
Historic house museums in Florida
Historical society museums in Florida
Houses in Lake County, Florida
Eustis, Florida